Chance Dixon Campbell (born October 8, 1999) is an American football linebacker for the Tennessee Titans of the National Football League (NFL). He played college football at Maryland and Ole Miss.

College career
Campbell began his college career at Maryland. He played mostly on special teams during his freshman season. Campbell played in 10 games with two starts as a sophomore and finished the season with 54 tackles, 4.5 tackles for loss, one forced fumble, and one interception. He led the Terrapins with 3 tackle and 5.5 tackles for loss in four games played in the team's COVID-19-shortened 2020 season. Following the end of the season, Campbell entered the NCAA transfer portal.

Campbell transferred to the University of Mississippi as a graduate transfer. He started all 13 of the Rebels' games and led the team with 109 tackles.

Professional career
Campbell was selected by the Tennessee Titans in the sixth round of the 2022 NFL Draft. He was placed on injured reserve on September 9, 2022.

References

External links
Tennessee Titans bio
Maryland Terrapins bio
Ole Miss Rebels bio

1999 births
Living people
People from Ellicott City, Maryland
Players of American football from Maryland
Sportspeople from the Baltimore metropolitan area
American football linebackers
Calvert Hall College High School alumni
Maryland Terrapins football players
Ole Miss Rebels football players
Tennessee Titans players